Segmentorbis kanisaensis is a species of air-breathing freshwater snail, aquatic pulmonate gastropod mollusk in the family Planorbidae, the ram's horn snails.

Distribution
Distribution of Segmentorbis kanisaensis include Angola, Benin, Burundi, Cameroon, Central African Republic, Chad, Congo, The Democratic Republic of the Congo, Côte d'Ivoire, Equatorial Guinea, Ethiopia, Gabon, Gambia, Ghana, Guinea, Guinea-Bissau, Kenya, Liberia, Mali, Mozambique, Namibia, Niger, Nigeria, Senegal, Sierra Leone, South Africa, Sudan, Tanzania, Togo, Uganda and Zambia.

Description 
All species within family Planorbidae have sinistral shells.

References

Planorbidae
Gastropods of Africa
Freshwater snails
Invertebrates of Equatorial Guinea
Gastropods described in 1914